'Mike' is a 2023 Malayalam language drama film directed by Vishnu Sivaprasad. The film stars Anaswara Rajan and debutant, Ranjith Sajeev in important roles. The film was produced by John Abraham. This film marks the debut production of John Abraham in Malayalam.

Plot 
Follows Sarah, a free spirited young girl looking to surgically reassign her gender and Antony, a once exuberant but now a hopeless young man. 
Sarah aka Mike is on her gender transitioning journey. She meets Antony, an youngster with alcohol use disorder. The quick camaraderie developed persuades the duo to travel ahead together.

Cast

Production

Release
The film was released in theatres on August 19, 2022.

Critical Response
Times Of India gave it a rating of 2.5/5  and wrote "On the whole, peripherally it could be a one time watch but the regressive thoughts in it would definitely influence the public opinion on gender roles, gender inclusivity and sensibility. 
".  
Onmanorama wrote, "Empathy is at the core of this Anaswara Rajan film."

References

External links
 

2022 films
Indian drama films
2022 drama films
2020s Malayalam-language films
Films scored by Hesham Abdul Wahab
Films shot in Kerala
Films shot in Idukki